Robert Tynes House, also known as Tynes Plantation, is a historic plantation house located near Smithfield, Isle of Wight County, Virginia. The house was built in 1750 and is a two-story, three-bay, Georgian style brick dwelling with a gambrel roof. The interior features a center-passage single-pile plan. Also on the property are the contributing garden and well, smokehouse / frame shed, and kitchen foundation. In 1802, its owner Timothy Tynes granted manumission of his 81 slaves and the division of his 4,000 acre estate primarily to his slaves.

It was listed on the National Register of Historic Places in 2007.

References

Plantation houses in Virginia
Houses on the National Register of Historic Places in Virginia
Georgian architecture in Virginia
Houses completed in 1750
Houses in Isle of Wight County, Virginia
National Register of Historic Places in Isle of Wight County, Virginia